The 2004 Twenty20 Cup was the second competing of the Twenty20 Cup competition for English and Welsh county clubs. The finals day took place on 7 August at Edgbaston, Birmingham, and was won by the Leicestershire Foxes.

Points table

Fixtures

Group stage

Midlands/Wales/West Division

North Division

South Division

Knockout stage

Quarter-finals

Semi-finals

Final

References
 Tournament site on ESPN CricInfo
 Tournament site on CricketArchive

Twenty20 Cup
Twenty20 Cup